Orphan of the Ghetto (Italian: L'orfana del ghetto) is a 1954 Italian historical melodrama film directed by Carlo Campogalliani. It is based on a novel of the same name by Carolina Invernizio.

Cast 
 Franca Marzi 
 Luisella Boni as Viola 
 Anna Arena 
 Renato Baldini 
 Alberto Farnese 
 Carlos Lamas 
 Barbara Leite 
 Carlo Lombardi 
 Nino Marchetti 
 Floriana Mulas 
 Nico Pepe 
 Letizia Quaranta 
 Domenico Serra

References

Bibliography
 Goble, Alan. The Complete Index to Literary Sources in Film. Walter de Gruyter, 1999.

External links

Orphan of the Ghetto at Variety Distribution

1954 films
1954 drama films
Italian drama films
1950s Italian-language films
Films directed by Carlo Campogalliani
Films scored by Giovanni Fusco
Melodramas
Italian black-and-white films
1950s Italian films